Love Is for Losers is the debut studio album by American rock band the Longshot. It was released on April 20, 2018, under an independent label.

Critical reception

Love Is for Losers received positive reviews from music critics. Jordan Bassett at NME said, "This freewheeling Billie Joe Armstrong side-project finds the frontman further energised and, this time round – unlike on that ill-advised triple album – he  sounds like he’s having masses of fun." He added that "‘Love Is for Losers’ finds him firmly in control, making his best album since ‘American Idiot’," a notion quoted on the vinyl release of the album. Dave Simpson of Pure Charts commended the album, saying that it "is an utterly entrancing synthesis of punk, rock and pop that features eleven fantastically spunky songs for fans to feast upon."

Some critics noted how the sound was different to that of Green Day, feeling that it would divide fans, while comparing its sound to that of Billie Joe Armstrong's other side-project, Foxboro Hot Tubs, with The Soundboard Reviews stating that it shows that "Armstrong is working in a familiar territory with very few tracks stand out to grab your attention [sic]."

Tour and promotion
The Longshot embarked on a tour shortly after the release of The Longshot EP, including songs from the album in addition to those on the EP. A music video for the album's title track, "Love Is for Losers", was released on April 20, 2018.

Track listing
All songs by Billie Joe Armstrong, except Goodbye to Romance by Ozzy Osbourne, Randy Rhoads and Bob Daisley.

Personnel
The Longshot
 Billie Joe Armstrong – vocals, guitars, bass, drums, producer, composer

Additional personnel (according to vinyl back cover)
 Chris Dugan – engineer (except 'The Last Time'), mixer
 Lee Bothwick - engineer ('The Last Time')
 Joey Armstrong – drums on "Happiness"

References

2018 debut albums
The Longshot (band) albums
Green Day
Self-released albums